Elections to Carrickfergus Borough Council were held on 7 June 2001 on the same day as the other Northern Irish local government elections. The election used three district electoral areas to elect a total of 17 councillors.

Election results

Note: "Votes" are the first preference votes.

Districts summary

|- class="unsortable" align="centre"
!rowspan=2 align="left"|Ward
! % 
!Cllrs
! % 
!Cllrs
! %
!Cllrs
! %
!Cllrs
!rowspan=2|TotalCllrs
|- class="unsortable" align="center"
!colspan=2 bgcolor="" | DUP
!colspan=2 bgcolor="" | Alliance
!colspan=2 bgcolor="" | UUP
!colspan=2 bgcolor="white"| Others
|-
|align="left"|Carrick Castle
|bgcolor="#D46A4C"|31.4
|bgcolor="#D46A4C"|2
|21.6
|1
|12.1
|1
|34.9
|1
|5
|-
|align="left"|Kilroot
|bgcolor="#D46A4C"|30.0
|bgcolor="#D46A4C"|2
|24.1
|2
|17.7
|1
|28.2
|1
|6
|-
|align="left"|Knockagh Monument
|34.0
|2
|24.2
|2
|bgcolor="40BFF5"|38.9
|bgcolor="40BFF5"|2
|2.9
|0
|6
|-
|- class="unsortable" class="sortbottom" style="background:#C9C9C9"
|align="left"| Total
|31.8
|6
|23.5
|5
|24.2
|4
|20.5
|2
|17
|-
|}

Districts results

Carrick Castle

1997: 2 x Independent, 1 x Alliance, 1 x DUP, 1 x UUP
2001: 2 x DUP, 1 x Alliance, 1 x UUP, 1 x Independent
1997-2001 Change: DUP gain from Independent

Kilroot

1997: 2 x Alliance, 2 x Independent Unionist, 1 x UUP, 1 x DUP
2001: 2 x Alliance, 2 x DUP, 1 x UUP, 1 x Independent
1997-2001 Change: DUP gain from Independent Unionist, Independent Unionist becomes Independent

Knockagh Monument

1997: 2 x UUP, 2 x Alliance, 1 x DUP, 1 x Independent Unionist
2001: 2 x UUP, 2 x Alliance, 2 x DUP
1997-2001 Change: DUP gain from Independent Unionist

References

Carrickfergus Borough Council elections
Carrickfergus